Yebôk is a village in Ann Township, Kyaukpyu District, in the Rakhine State of southwestern Burma. It is located southwest of  Sakanmaw  and south of Mawhun.

References

External links
Maplandia World Gazetteer

Populated places in Kyaukpyu District
Ann Township